Frederick Gardner Orford Budd (11 February 1904 – 1 December 1976) was an Irish judge, barrister and politician who served as a Judge of the Supreme Court from 1966 to 1975, a Judge of the High Court from 1951 to 1966, and a Senator for the Dublin University constituency from August 1951 to October 1961.

In 1925, he was a scholar of Trinity College Dublin studying Modern History and Political Science.

He was elected to Seanad Éireann as an independent Senator in August 1951, by the Dublin University constituency. He resigned from the Seanad on 2 October 1951, following his appointment as a judge of the High Court. William J. E. Jessop won the subsequent by-election.

He was appointed to the Supreme Court of Ireland in 1966 and served until 1975. He is credited for his role in some of the most progressive decisions of the Supreme Court during his time, often forming a 3/2 majority with Brian Walsh and Chief Justice Cearbhall O Dalaigh.

Budd married Oonah Blennerhassett in August 1931 and they had one son, (future High Court Justice Declan Budd), and three daughters.

References

1904 births
1976 deaths
Independent members of Seanad Éireann
Members of the 7th Seanad
Judges of the Supreme Court of Ireland
Irish barristers
Alumni of Trinity College Dublin
High Court judges (Ireland)
20th-century Irish lawyers
Members of Seanad Éireann for Dublin University